Jean Louis d'Elderen (29 September 1620 – 1 February 1694) was the 63rd prince-bishop of Liège during the opening years of the War of the Grand Alliance.  He was born in Tongeren.

Life
Elderen was born in Tongeren, the son of Guillaume, lord of Genoels-Elderen, and Elisabeth de Warnant. He became a canon on 8 November 1636, cantor of Liège Cathedral in 1661, and dean of Liège in 1669. At Maximilian Henry of Bavaria's death in 1688 he was elected as successor despite French efforts to promote Wilhelm Egon von Fürstenberg to the see and Austrian lobbying for Joseph Clemens of Bavaria. Elderen was sworn in as ruler of the prince-bishopric on 17 August and was consecrated bishop on 27 December. Despite seeking to maintain the neutrality of Liège in the Nine Years' War, the city was occupied by allied troops and the territory was invaded by the French. On 4 June 1691 the city of Liège was bombarded by French forces commanded by Marshal Bouffiers.

References

Further reading
 Roeland Goorts, War, State, and Society in Liège: How a Small State of the Holy Roman Empire survived the Nine Year's War, 1688-1697 (Leuven University Press, 2019)
 Paul Harsin, Les relations extérieures de la principauté de Liège sous Jean Louis d'Elderen et Joseph Clément de Bavière, 1688–1718 (Liège and Paris, 1927)

External links
Catholic Hierarchy page

1620 births
1694 deaths
Prince-Bishops of Liège
17th-century Roman Catholic bishops in the Holy Roman Empire